Kokrica is a settlement just north of Kranj in the Upper Carniola region of Slovenia.

The parish church, built slightly north of the main settlement centre, is dedicated to Saint Laurence.

References

External links

Kokrica on Geopedia

Populated places in the City Municipality of Kranj